Romain Gijssels (Denderwindeke, 10 March 1907 – Paris, 31 March 1978) was a Belgian professional road bicycle racer between 1930 and 1936.

In 1932, Gijssels won both the Tour of Flanders and Paris–Roubaix in the same season, which (up to 2006) has only been accomplished by nine riders.

Major achievements 

1931
 Tour of Flanders
 Grand Prix Wolber
 2nd, Bordeaux–Paris
 3rd, Paris–Brussels
1932
 Tour of Flanders
 Paris–Roubaix
 Bordeaux–Paris
1933
 Marseille-Lyon
 St Niklaas
 2nd, Critérium des As
 3rd, Tour of Flanders
 3rd, Bordeaux–Paris
1934
 Paris-Belfort
 2nd, Paris–Tours
 32nd, Tour de France
1935
 3rd, Critérium des As

References

1907 births
1978 deaths
Belgian male cyclists
Cyclists from East Flanders
People from Ninove